Matthew Dent may refer to:
Matthew Dent (footballer), former Australian rules footballer
Matthew Dent (designer), designer of the new British coinage